Lawrence John Saldanha  (born 12 June 1936) is an Indian-born retired Pakistani archbishop. Born in Mangalore, India, he received his religious training at the Christ the King seminary in Karachi and was ordained a priest in Lahore, Pakistan on 16 January 1960.

Biography
He also earned a doctorate in systematic theology from Rome-based Pontifical Urbaniana University. He participated in the Second Vatican Council.

He served in different parishes in Lahore. He served from 1971 to 1974 as editor of the Catholic Naqib, the Archdiocese's Urdu bimonthly. He was also rector of Christ the King Seminary in Karachi from 1974 to 1979 and taught dogmatic theology there until 1983.

From 1986 to 1998, he was head of the social communications commission and WAVE Studio, the Church's national audiovisual center in Lahore. He also headed the UCA News bureau in Pakistan.

He was serving as associate pastor of Precious Blood Church in Toronto, Canada, when he was recalled to serve the Church in Pakistan. On 24 Apr 2001 he was appointed Archbishop of Lahore by Pope John Paul II. He took as his motto Heralds of Hope.

On 16 January 2010, Archbishop Saldanha celebrated his Golden Jubilee as a priest, of serving his church for 50 years.

On 7 April 2011 Archbishop Saldanha retired as Archbishop of Lahore.

Saldanha also served as the first executive secretary of Caritas Pakistan from 1966 to 1973, chairman of Radio Veritas Asia, and president of the Federation of Asian Bishops' Conferences.

He returned to Canada after his retirement in 2011 and is helping persecuted Pakistani Christians in Canada.

In 2016 Saldanha became a Canadian citizen.

On January 16, 2020, he celebrated his 60th anniversary of his priestly ordination at Precious Blood Parish in Toronto, Canada.

External links

Daily Times, 23 January 2006
Archdiocese of Lahore
Agenzia Fides 14/05/2004
BBC News, 2 November 2006

References

1936 births
21st-century Roman Catholic archbishops in Pakistan
Pakistani people of Mangalorean descent
St. Anthony's High School, Lahore alumni
Christian clergy from Mangalore
20th-century Canadian Roman Catholic priests
Canadian people of Pakistani descent
Living people
Roman Catholic archbishops of Lahore